Margery is a female given name derived from Margaret, which can also be spelled as Marjorie, Margaery or Marjory. From the Old French, the Middle English forms of Margaret equally derive from the Greek for pearl. Margery, Marjorie and Marjory in the 14th century became a medieval softened translation of French and Church Latin versions of Margaret. After the Middle Ages this name was rare, but it was revived at the end of the 19th century.

Short forms of the name include Marge and Margie.

Middle Ages and Renaissance (Tudor) period
 Margery Arnold (fl. mid 14th century), English landowner
 Margery Baxter, early English church disempowerment activist (Lollard), sentenced to Sunday floggings in 1429
 Margery Brews (d.1495), English love letter writer
 Margery Byset or Margaret/Margery Bissett and variations, turn of 15th century protagonist of the noble Bissett family of Ireland
 Margery de Burgh, 13th century Norman-Irish noblewoman
 Margery Golding, or Margaret, Countess of Oxford, verbally Lady de Vere, wife of John de Vere, 16th Earl of Oxford
 Margery of Hedsor, early 14th century redeemed wayward nun of Burnham Abbey
 Margery Jourdemayne, "the Witch of Eye", executed in 1441 in England
 Margery Kempe, early 15th century English Christian mystic, known for writing what is considered to be the first autobiography in the English language
 Margery Wentworth, later Lady Margaret Seymour, courtier, grandmother to Edward VI of England

Post-Tudor era
 Margery Allingham, British murder mystery and crime fiction novelist
 Margery Beddingfield (1742–1763), British criminal
 Margery Beddow, American actress, dancer, director and choreographer
 Margery Booth, British-German opera singer; British spy
 Margery Bronster, Attorney General of Hawaii
 Margery Corbett Ashby, British Liberal politician, feminist and internationalist
 Margery Clinton, Scottish ceramics artist of reduction lustre glazes
 Mina "Margery" Crandon, American 20th century physical medium and illusionist
 Margery Cuyler, American children's book author
 Margery Deane, American author
 Margery Eagan, American columnist with the Boston Herald, talk radio host
 Margery Edwards, Australian artist: spiritual abstract expressionist who worked with mixed media
 Margery Fish, English gardener and gardening writer, specialising in informal cottage gardens
 Margery Fisher, British literary critic and academic
 Margery Fry, British prison reformer
 Margery Gardner, actress; 1946 murder victim
 Margery Greenwood, Viscountess Greenwood (née Spencer), British aristocrat
 Margery Hinton, British Olympic swimming medalist
 Margery Mason, English actress and director
 Margery Maude, English actress
 Margery Palmer McCulloch, Scottish literary scholar, author and critic
 Dame Margery Perham, British historian of, and writer on, African affairs
 Margery Ruth Morgenstern Krueger, real name of Jayge Carr, American science fiction and fantasy author
 Margery Sharp, English writer, author of The Rescuers and sequel adapted by Disney
 Margery Saunders, British film editor
 Margery Ward, NDP politician in Ontario
 Margery Williams (Bianco), children's author
 Margery Wilson, American actress and silent movie director
 Margery Wren (1850–1930), English murder victim

See also
Margery (disambiguation)
Marjorie
Marjory